The women's event of the 2015 World Sprint Speed Skating Championships was held on 28 February – 1 March 2015.

Day 1

500 m
The race was started at 17:30.

1000 m
The race was started at 19:12.

Day 2

500 m
The race was started at 18:30.

1000 m
The race was started at 20:09.

Overall standings
After all events.

References

Women
World